Flight from Destiny is a 1941 American drama film directed by Vincent Sherman and written by Barry Trivers. The film stars Geraldine Fitzgerald, Thomas Mitchell, Jeffrey Lynn, James Stephenson, Mona Maris and Jonathan Hale. The film was released by Warner Bros. on February 8, 1941.

Plot

Cast  
Geraldine Fitzgerald as Betty Farroway
Thomas Mitchell as Professor Henry Todhunter
Jeffrey Lynn as Michael Farroway
James Stephenson as Dr. Lawrence Stevens
Mona Maris as Ketti Moret
Jonathan Hale as District Attorney
David Bruce as Saunders
Thurston Hall as Dean Somers
Mary Gordon as Martha
John Eldredge as Peterson
Hardie Albright as Ferrers
William Forrest as Prentiss
Weldon Heyburn as Brooks
William Hopper as Travin 
Alexander Lockwood as Conway
Frank Reicher as Edvaard Kreindling
Willie Best as George
Libby Taylor as Maid

Reception
T.M.P. of The New York Times said, "What would you do if you only had six months to live?" That is the problem which confronts Thomas Mitchell as an elderly professor suffering from an aortic aneurysm in Flight From Destiny. The same question has been pondered before on the screen, but seldom has it been dealt with so intelligently and entertainingly as in the new Warner drama at the Palace. Scenarist Barry Trivers has avoided artfully the pitfalls of a morbid theme by having Professor Todhunter regard his plight philosophically. And it was most fortunate that an actor of Mr. Mitchell's ability was selected to interpret the role, for he is a tower of strength."

References

External links 
 

1941 films
Warner Bros. films
American drama films
1941 drama films
Films directed by Vincent Sherman
Films scored by Heinz Roemheld
American black-and-white films
1940s English-language films
1940s American films